Asura phaeobasis is a moth of the family Erebidae. It is found on the Louisiade Archipelago.

References

phaeobasis
Moths described in 1900
Moths of New Guinea